Sideroxylon contrerasii is a species of plant in the family Sapotaceae. It is found in Costa Rica, Guatemala, Mexico, and Panama.

References

contrerasii
Trees of Hidalgo (state)
Trees of Oaxaca
Trees of Veracruz
Flora of Central America
Near threatened plants
Taxonomy articles created by Polbot
Plants described in 1975